Lucy Tamlyn (born 1955) is an American diplomat who has served as the United States ambassador to the Democratic Republic of the Congo since February 2023. She previously served as chargé d'affaires to Sudan (from February to August of 2022); as United States ambassador to the Central African Republic (from 2019 to 2022); and as United States ambassador to Benin (from 2015 to 2018).

Early life and education

Tamlyn is from New York City. Her father, Thomas Tamlyn, was a cardiologist who served in 1969 on the SS Hope, a ship that brought medical support to underserved areas. Her mother, Ann Donaldson Tamlyn, later ran unsuccessfully for a seat in the United States House of Representatives.

Tamlyn earned a Bachelor of Arts from St. John's College in 1978. Tamlyn then completed her Master of Arts at Columbia University's School of International Affairs in 1980.

Career

Tamlyn joined the United States Foreign Service in 1982. In her early career, she held assignments in Austria, Colombia, Mozambique, and domestically, in Washington, DC and New York City, NY. She served as political officer in Brazil and represented the United States to the Food and Agriculture Organization in Rome. From 2005 to 2008, Tamlyn served as deputy chief of mission at the United States Embassy in N’Djamena, Chad. She then became provincial reconstruction team leader in Erbil, Iraq from 2008 to 2009. After Iraq, she served in Paris, France, as Economic Counselor at the United States Mission to the Organization for Economic Cooperation and Development, and in Lisbon, Portugal as deputy chief of mission at the United States Embassy there.  From 2013 to 2015, Tamlyn served in Washington, DC as director of the Office of the Special Envoy for Sudan and South Sudan.

Ambassador to Benin
On March 24, 2015, President Barack Obama nominated Tamlyn to be the next United States ambassador to the Republic of Benin. Hearings were held on her nomination by the Senate Foreign Relations Committee on July 30, 2015. The committee favorably reported the nomination to the Senate floor on October 1, 2015. She was confirmed by the Senate on October 8, 2015 via voice vote. Her term began October 13, 2015 and she presented her credentials on November 8, 2015. She left her post as ambassador to Benin in October 2018.

Ambassador to Central African Republic
On July 27, 2018, President Donald Trump nominated Tamlyn to be the next United States ambassador to the Central African Republic. Hearings on her nomination were held by the Senate Foreign Relations Committee on September 26, 2018. The committee favorably reported the nomination on November 28, 2018. She was confirmed by the Senate via voice vote on January 2, 2019, and sworn in on January 11, 2019. Tamlyn presented her credentials to President Faustin-Archange Touadéra on February 6, 2019. She left her post as ambassador to the Central African Republic in January 2022.

Charge d'Affaires to Sudan
Tamlyn was appointed Chargé d'Affaires ad interim to Sudan on January 17, 2022. She arrived in Khartoum on February 3, 2022, and she left on August 11, 2022.

Ambassador to DRC
On June 22, 2022, President Joe Biden nominated Tamlyn to serve as the United States ambassador to the Democratic Republic of the Congo. Hearings on her nomination were held before the Senate Foreign Relations Committee on August 3, 2022. The committee favorably reported her nomination to the Senate floor on December 7, 2022. On December 20, 2022, her nomination was confirmed by the Senate via voice vote.

Tamlyn was officially sworn in as ambassador to the Democratic Republic of the Congo on December 28, 2002. She arrived in Kinshasa on January 26, 2023, and she presented her credentials to President Félix Tshisekedi on February 6, 2023.

Awards and recognitions
Tamlyn has won notable State Department awards, including the Secretary’s Award for Expeditionary Service.

Personal life
Tamlyn is married to travel writer and photographer Jorge M. Serpa of Portugal. They have two children. She speaks French and Portuguese.

See also

Ambassadors of the United States

References

1955 births
Living people
21st-century American diplomats
21st-century American women
Ambassadors of the United States to Benin
Ambassadors of the United States to the Central African Republic
Ambassadors of the United States to Sudan
American women ambassadors
Obama administration personnel
School of International and Public Affairs, Columbia University alumni
St. John's College (Annapolis/Santa Fe) alumni
United States Foreign Service personnel
American women diplomats